Jędrzej Edward Moraczewski (13 January 1870 – 5 August 1944) was a Polish socialist politician who, loyal to Józef Piłsudski and viewed as acceptable by both left- and right-wing Polish political factions, served as the second Prime Minister of the Second Polish Republic between November 1918 and January 1919. He had previously served as Minister of Communications. Subsequently, from 1925 to 1929, he served as Minister of Public Labour.

Moraczewski died on 5 August 1944 when he was hit by shrapnel fired by a Soviet soldier into his house. He was buried at Powązki Military Cemetery.

References

Source publications

External links 

 

1870 births
1944 deaths
People from Trzemeszno
People from the Province of Posen
Polish Social Democratic Party of Galicia politicians
Polish Socialist Party politicians
Prime Ministers of Poland
Government ministers of Poland
Deputy Marshals of the Sejm of the Second Polish Republic
Members of the Austrian House of Deputies (1907–1911)
Members of the Austrian House of Deputies (1911–1918)
Members of the Legislative Sejm of the Second Polish Republic
Members of the Sejm of the Second Polish Republic (1922–1927)